Chen An-Hu (born 31 December 1924) is a Taiwanese former sport shooter who competed in the 1960 Summer Olympics.

References

1924 births
Living people
Taiwanese male sport shooters
Olympic shooters of Taiwan
Shooters at the 1960 Summer Olympics
Sportspeople from Beijing
Taiwanese people from Beijing
20th-century Taiwanese people